Matthew Andrew Petersen (born 27 March 1980) is a former United States international rugby league footballer who played for the Wakefield Trinity Wildcats in the Super League. He also played for the Gold Coast Titans in the NRL.

Background
Petersen was born in Subiaco, Western Australia. He played his junior rugby league for 
Belmont Steelers in the Perth Rugby League.

Playing career
After playing for the Belmont Steelers, a Western Australian feeder club for the North Queensland Cowboys, Petersen was called up to the NRL in 2002.  Petersen moved from North Queensland to the Parramatta Eels half way through 2002 and played for the Eels with some success until 2006.  Early in his career at the Eels, Petersen was at the centre of a spiteful match against the Brisbane Broncos at Parramatta Stadium after Allan Langer appeared to drop his knees into Petersen, some members of the crowd later throwing bottles at Broncos players.

Petersen equalled the club try-scoring record for one match during the 2003 round 12 clash against the South Sydney Rabbitohs. Scoring four tries in the one game, he was the first Parramatta player to have done so since 1988.

In 2005, Petersen made 13 appearances for Parramatta as the club won the Minor Premiership but he did not feature in any of the finals matches.

Parramatta care-taker coach, Jason Taylor, dropped Petersen from the first-grade roster when he took over coaching duties  in May, 2006, and demoted the under-performing winger to the Premier League, where he spent the rest of the season.

"Side-Show Bob" joined the Titans in 2007 for their first year in the NRL. He performed well and was well known as "Sideshow Bob" due to his thick, curly hair. He ended the season with the most tries scored, shared with Mat Rogers. At the end of 2007 he played for America. In May, 2008, he was given an immediate release to join Super League side Wakefield Trinity Wildcats.

As of 2012, he currently plays rugby league in Gympie.

Griffith Uni Colleges Knights
Since 2017, Petersen has been a player and specialist backs Coach for the Griffith Uni Colleges Knights Rugby Union Club. Petersen helped the Knights to their Second Gold Coast District Rugby Union Premiership in 2018 in his position of Backs Coach. Club Captain Shaun Cole was quoted as saying "Without Petersens help with our defensive patterns the club wouldn't be where it is today" 
He has since re-signed for the 2019 season.

Representative career
In 2004, Petersen played a game for the United States against Australia in an exhibition match in Philadelphia, qualifying for the American side under the parent rule.

In 2007, Petersen was named as captain of the USA team for their 2008 Rugby League World Cup qualifying match against Samoa. He was awarded Man of the Match for the game, but could not stop the USA falling to defeat.

Petersen made a comeback in 2013, being named as part of the USA squad for the 2013 Rugby League World Cup. He scored a try in their opening win over the Cook Islands.

Career highlights 
First Grade Début: 2002 - Round 1, North Queensland v Brisbane at Dairy Farmers Stadium, 16 March
International: 2004 - United States vs Australia, scoring one try

Footnotes

External links
 Official Gold Coast Titans Website
 Matthew Petersen at NRL.com

1980 births
Living people
Australian rugby league players
Australian expatriate sportspeople in England
Australian people of American descent
Gold Coast Titans players
Parramatta Eels players
North Queensland Cowboys players
Rugby league wingers
Rugby league players from Perth, Western Australia
United States national rugby league team players
Wakefield Trinity players